Saint Francis School is a Catholic school in the temple-town of Baidyanathdham, Deoghar, India.

History
It was established in 1970 under the aegis of the Franciscan Friars (Third Order Regular of St. Francis). Francis of Assisi is the patron saint of the school.

Gallery

See also
Education in India
Literacy in India
List of schools in India

References

Catholic schools in India
Primary schools in India
High schools and secondary schools in Jharkhand
Christian schools in Jharkhand
Deoghar
Educational institutions established in 1970
1970 establishments in Bihar